The name Isang has been used for sixteen tropical cyclones worldwide: fifteen times by the Philippine Atmospheric, Geophysical and Astronomical Services Administration (PAGASA) in the Western Pacific, and once by the Météo-France in the South-West Indian Ocean.

In the Western Pacific Ocean:
 Typhoon Doris (1964) (T6407, 09W, Isang) – a minimal typhoon which threatened but ultimately did not affect land areas.
 Tropical Storm Winnie (1972) (T7212, 12W, Isang) – strong tropical storm which made landfall in eastern China.
 Typhoon Sally (1976) (T7608, 08W, Isang) – a Category 4-equivalent typhoon which stayed at sea.
 Tropical Depression Isang (1980) – short-lived tropical depression which made landfall in northern Luzon; only recognized by JMA and PAGASA.
 Typhoon Holly (1984) (T8409, 10W, Isang) – a typhoon which affected southern Japan, the Korean Peninsula and the Soviet Union.
 Tropical Depression Isang (1988) – a weak system that was only tracked by PAGASA.
 Severe Tropical Storm Polly (1992) (T9216, 16W, Isang) – deadly tropical storm which severely affected China's Fujian and Zhejiang provinces, claiming 202 lives.
 Typhoon Kirk (1996) (T9612, 13W, Isang) – a strong typhoon which struck Japan, causing 4 deaths and moderate damage.
 Typhoon Bilis (2000) (T0010, 18W, Isang) – the strongest typhoon to form during the 2000 season; struck Taiwan and China, killing 71.
 Typhoon Toraji (2001) (T0108, 11W, Isang) – destructive typhoon which killed at least 200 people in Taiwan and China.
 Typhoon Talim (2005) (T0513, 13W, Isang) – another strong typhoon which made landfall in Taiwan and eastern China, causing 157 fatalities.
 Typhoon Molave (2009) (T0906, 07W, Isang) – a mid-season typhoon that brushed the northern part of the Philippines before making landfall in China.
 Tropical Storm Cimaron (2013) (T1308, 08W, Isang) – a tropical storm which struck the Philippines and China, inflicting moderate damage.
 Typhoon Hato (2017) (T1713, 15W, Isang) – one of the strongest typhoons to affect Macau and Hong Kong, causing at least $6 billion worth of damage.
 Tropical Storm Omais (2021) (T2112, 16W, Isang) – long-lived system which eventually affected the southern Japanese islands and hit the Korean Peninsula as a remnant low.

In the South-West Indian Ocean:
 Severe Tropical Storm Isang (2005) – a relatively strong tropical storm which stayed at sea. 

Pacific typhoon set index articles
South-West Indian Ocean cyclone set index articles